BT or Bt may refer to:

Arts, media and entertainment

The arts
 BT (musician) (born Brian Transeau), American electronic musician
 BT (album), a 2000 album by Buck-Tick
 Burton Taylor Studio or The BT, managed by Oxford Playhouse

Fictional entities
 BT, a character in the television series .hack//Sign
 BT (meaning "beached thing"), a type of fictional creature in the Death Stranding game

News media
 B.T. (tabloid), a Danish newspaper
 , a Norwegian newspaper
 Breakfast Television, a Canadian morning television news program
 The Business Times (Singapore), a financial newspaper

Businesses

Financial services
 BT (Wealth Management), wealth management brand within Westpac group in Australia
 Banca Transilvania, a bank in Romania
 Bankers Trust, a banking organisation

Public transport
 AirBaltic, a Latvian airline (IATA code BT)
 Blacksburg Transit, Virginia, US
 Burlington Transit, Ontario, Canada
 Brampton Transit, a local municipal bus service for the city of Brampton, Ontario, Canada

Telecommunications
 BT Group plc, parent company of British Telecom
 BT Global Services, a division of the BT Group
 BT Consumer, a division of the BT Group

Other businesses
 BT, a brand of Bulgarian tobacco producer Bulgartabac
 Brooktree, a semiconductor company later acquired by Rockwell Semiconductor

Places
 Bhutan (ISO country code BT)
 .bt, Bhutan's country-code Top Level Domain
 Barton County, Kansas (state county code BT)

Europe
 BT postcode area, which covers the whole of Northern Ireland
 Province of Barletta-Andria-Trani, Italy (vehicle registration code)
 Bačka Topola, Serbia (vehicle registration code)
 Bayreuth, Germany (vehicle registration code)
 Bitola, Republic of Macedonia (vehicle registration code)
 Botoșani, Romania (vehicle registration code)
 Botoșani County, Romania (ISO 3166-2:RO code)
 Kherson Oblast, Ukraine (vehicle registration code)

Science and technology
 Haplogroup BT, a Y-chromosome gene group
 Biotite, a phyllosilicate mineral
 BT tank, any in a series of Soviet light tanks produced in large numbers between 1932 and 1941
 BT-Epoxy, a polymer used in printed circuit boards
 Bacillus thuringiensis, a bacterium used as a pesticide
 Bathythermograph, an underwater thermometer
 BitTorrent, an Internet file-sharing protocol
 Bluetooth, a wireless connection technology

Other uses
 Baronet, a title in the British honours system abbreviated "Bt" or formerly "Bt."
 Body thetan, a concept in the Scientology belief system
 Brian Taylor (Australian footballer), nickname
 BT grade tea

See also
 BST (disambiguation)